Keariene Muizz (born November 18, 1977) is a contemporary American painter known for depicting the statues of Paris and being the first person to create clothes out of oil paintings that she had made. Keariene is also known to incorporate the psychoanalytic literature of Sigmund Freud into her artistic theories. Additionally, she is an arts and culture reporter that broadcasts live on KX 93.5 fm, Radio Caravan.

Biography

Early life 
Muizz was born in Chicago. Muizz's mother is Black American and Her father is Muslim.

Keariene moved sporadically across the United States throughout her life. She attended three high schools her freshman year and eventually graduated from Whittier High School. Her creative beginnings expanded during this time as she began sculpting, gaining the attention of various faculty members. Her logical approach to interpreting her environment would be applied to every facet of her life. This detail would also be reflected later in her love of illustrating Parisian architecture and sculpture.

Career 
At the age of nineteen the young artist began collecting paint supplies with the intention of shifting from sketch pad to canvas. She would explain it later to the Associated Press as, "...a knot in my heart that I could not untie with words." It was not until the adventurous and reclusive Muizz went to Europe for six weeks, traveling alone to England, Greece, Italy, and eventually France that she would commit to her artistic path. Upon her return she completed her first painting, a portrait of her older sister. Thus starting her interest in using found materials for her artwork, and fueling her need to create the expensive 'Zdenka Cuff'.

In 2006, Muizz opened her first art gallery. She later moved Muizz Gallery to Lido in Newport Beach.  
 
Haunted by the unsolved murder of Jeanette O'Keefe Muizz revealed the dimensions of her grief through the unveiling of the Sacred Stones Collection. Noted as the first artist in history to depict the tombs of the Pere Lachaise Cemetery.

In February 2009, Jeanette O'Keefe's murderer was apprehended in Paris, France. Her murderer was given the maximum sentence under French law in January 2012. The news of this conviction is said to have been the catalyst behind the artists desire to transform her oil painting "Playing G-d" into a hand sewn maxi dress, using nothing save the painting itself.

References

External links 

 Official Website
 KX 93.5 FM Radio Caravan
 Official Facebook
 Official Blog
 NY Arts Magazine
 AP Member Gallery

1977 births
Living people
American people of Ethiopian-Jewish descent
African-American Jews
Jewish American artists
University of Paris alumni
People from Los Angeles County, California
People from Orange County, California
American women painters
Artists from Chicago
American radio personalities
21st-century American women artists
21st-century African-American women
21st-century African-American artists
21st-century American Jews